Laurel Lake may refer to:

Settlements 
Laurel Lake, New Jersey

Lakes 
Laurel Lake (Cumberland County, Pennsylvania)
Laurel Lake (Teton County, Wyoming) in Grand Teton National Park
Laurel River Lake west of Corbin, Kentucky